See article above for overview of 50% endpoints and comparison with other methods of calculating 50% endpoints.

The Reed–Muench method is a simple method for determining 50% endpoints in experimental biology, that is, the concentration of a test substance that produces an effect of interest in half of the test units. Examples include LD50 (the median lethal dose of a toxin or pathogen), EC50 and IC50 (half maximal effective or inhibitory concentration, respectively, of a drug), and TCID50 (50% tissue culture infectious dose of a virus).

The reason for using 50% endpoints is that many dose-response relationships in biology follow a logistic function that flattens out as it approaches the minimal and maximal responses, so it is easier to measure the concentration of the test substance that produces a 50% response.

Notes

Toxicology tests